The Earth Party, previously called The Earth Party Movement (abbreviated MPT, hence called MPT – Partido da Terra), is a green-conservative political party in Portugal, founded on 12 August 1993. Its main political priorities are the promotion of environmental-friendly policies and the preservation of the national and cultural heritage of Portugal and of the remaining Portuguese-language countries.

Between 2005 and 2009, the party had two Deputies in the Assembly of the Republic: Pedro Quartin Graça and Luís Carloto Marques, elected on the lists of the Social Democratic Party (PSD), following an agreement with its then leader, Pedro Santana Lopes.

The President of the party is Pedro Pimenta, a night watchman, elected in 2020.

The party has participated in a number of coalitions with the major centre-right parties in Portugal, namely the PSD and People's Party (CDS–PP). The MPT was a member of the European People's Party group during the eighth term of the European Parliament, having previously been a member of the Alliance of Liberals and Democrats for Europe (ALDE) and an observer member of the Liberal International.

History

2009 European Parliament elections 
In April 2009, the party announced in a joint press conference with the leader of the pan-European alliance Libertas.eu Declan Ganley that it would run for the 2009 European Parliament election with an open electoral list under the banner of Libertas. While not against European integration, MPT demands more accountability and transparency from the European Union, and the pursuit of a referendum on the Lisbon Treaty in Portugal. In the elections, MPT received 24,062 votes (0.67% of the votes).

2009 Legislative elections 
For the 2009 Portuguese legislative election, MPT formed a coalition with the Humanist Party on mainland Portugal that received 0.22% of the votes. Including MPT's votes in Azores and Madeira, where they ran a list on their own, they reached 0.28% nationwide. However, the 2009 local elections were a success in terms of the number of people elected, as MPT elected two councilors, 17 municipal assembly members and 47 parish councilor posts.

2011 Elections 
In the 2011 Portuguese legislative election, MPT stood under its own open lists throughout Portugal and achieved 0.41% of the national vote, catapulting it from 14th to 8th place overall in comparison to the 2009 Portuguese legislative election. This was largely due to its more professional campaigning – it employed a campaign manager for the first time – and the inclusion in its lists of a number of popular celebrities.

In the 2011 Madeira regional election the Party elected one Legislative Assembly member despite a fall in its number of votes of 0.3%.

2014 European Parliament elections 
MPT achieved its first major electoral success independent of any coalition, in the 2014 European Parliament election, winning 7.14% of the vote and electing two MEPs: the former Chairman of the Portuguese Bar Association António Marinho e Pinto (who subsequently left the party due to personal differences with his fellow MEP) and the lawyer José Inácio Faria.

On 21 November 2014, the MPT was admitted as a full member of the Alliance of Liberals and Democrats for Europe (ALDE) at the ALDE congress in Lisbon.

2014 Party Congress 
MPT held its IX Party Congress on 22 November 2014 in Lisbon, where incumbent president John Rosas Baker announced his intention not to stand for reelection and was replaced by MEP José Inácio Faria.

2015 Legislative elections 
The party contested the 2015 legislative election under its own open lists but, in what was widely considered a fiasco, failed to improve on its 2009 Portuguese legislative election result, gaining less than 0.5% of the popular vote and failing to elect any MPs to the Assembly of the Republic.

2018 Financial insolvency 
On 21 and 22 October 2018, the MPT had its bank accounts blocked due to a court decision and financial liabilities. As a consequence, the party fell into insolvency. The then-party leader Luís Vicente informed the public about this situation on 21 December 2018.

2019 Legislative elections 
The 2019 legislative elections, which were contested under MPT's own open lists, had a disastrous outcome, with the party losing practically half of its previous votes.

2022 Legislative elections 
MPT contested the 2022 legislative elections under its own open lists, ending up losing more than half of the votes previously held for the second consecutive time.

Electoral results

Assembly of the Republic

European Parliament

Municipalities

Parishes

References

External links 
MPT

1993 establishments in Portugal
Conservative parties in Portugal
Green conservative parties
Green parties in Europe
European People's Party
Libertas.eu
Organisations based in Lisbon
Political parties established in 1993
Political parties in Portugal